The Dead Alive, also called John Jago's Ghost, is a novella written in 1874 by Wilkie Collins based on the Boorn Brothers murder case. It was reprinted with a side-by-side examination of the case by Rob Warden in 2005 by Northwestern Press.

Radio adaptation
The Dead Alive was presented on Suspense March 9, 1953. The 30-minute adaptation starred Herbert Marshall.

References

External links
 
 

1874 British novels
Crime novels
Non-fiction crime books
Novels by Wilkie Collins